Interisland Airlines is an air charter company headquartered in Ninoy Aquino International Airport in Pasay, Manila, the Philippines. It is a subsidiary of Interisland Resorts & Services, Inc. and provides domestic and international charter services carrying passengers and cargo.

History
Interisland Airlines was founded in 1986 as Interisland Air Services Incorporated. The airline was founded by Luke and Consuelo Helgen. Soon after, other people joined the company from Interisland Resorts & Services Incorporated: Lydia Dizon acting as Chief Financial Officer (CFO), Gloria Belen acting as Trustee, and Marcelo Rivera as the Chief Operating Officer. The airline started as charter services company with 2 Bell 206 Helicopters, both Long Ranger and Jetranger, and 4 private jets from Aero Commander, Cessna, Dassault, Bell & Pilatus Aircraft.

In 2004, the airline acquired two YAK-40 aircraft and sold their helicopters. As a result, they rebranded to the current name Interisland Airlines in December.

On March 30, 2010, the airline was added to the European list of banned air carriers. A month later on April 23, its air operator's certificate was revoked following a fatal accident involving an Antonov An-12 that had occurred two days earlier.

Destinations
Interisland Airlines operates charter services only.

Fleet

Accidents and incidents
 On 19 July 2005, a Yakovlev Yak-40 was damaged beyond repair when it touched down short of the runway at Godofredo P. Ramos Airport after a flight from Ninoy Aquino International Airport. There were no injuries.
 On 2 November 2006, another Yakovlev Yak-40 was damaged beyond repair when its left main gear tire burst while landing at Godofredo P. Ramos Airport and it swerved off the runway. There were no injuries.
 On 21 April 2010, an Antonov An-12BP cargo aircraft, leased from Almaty Aviation and flying from Mactan–Cebu International Airport to Clark International Airport, crashed near Mexico, Pampanga, killing three of the six persons on board. Prior to crashing, flight control had received an emergency call regarding an on-board fire. Upon impact, the aircraft broke in two and burst into flames.

References

External links

Airlines established in 1986
Airlines of the Philippines
Companies based in Pasay